General Hodgson may refer to:

Henry Hodgson (British Army officer) (1868–1930), British Army major general
John Hodgson (British Army officer) (1757–1846), British Army general
Studholme Hodgson (1708–1798), British Army general
Studholme John Hodgson (c. 1803–1890), British Army general